Fyr og Flamme is a Danish music duo consisting of Jesper Groth and Laurits Emanuel, that represented Denmark in the Eurovision Song Contest 2021 in Rotterdam with the song ”Øve os på hinanden”.

Career
Fyr og Flamme became successful in 2020 with the debut single "Menneskeforbruger", which reached number one on the P3 Listen Danish chart in September 2020. In December 2020, the group released their second single "Kamæleon", and in March 2021, they won Dansk Melodi Grand Prix with "Øve os på hinanden". It was the first time since 1997 that Denmark has sent a song completely in Danish to represent the country in Eurovision Song Contest. They failed to qualify from the second semi-final.

Discography

Albums

Singles

References

Eurovision Song Contest entrants for Denmark
Eurovision Song Contest entrants of 2021